Nefteyugansk is a city in Khanty-Mansi Autonomous Okrug, Russia, located south of the Ob River, close to the larger city of Surgut. Population:

History
It was founded on October 16, 1967, after an oil field had been discovered on a small forest clearing in the middle of the taiga marshland in 1961. The main and the only big enterprise in the city, Yuganskneftegaz, was founded in February 1966. The name 'Yugansk' comes from the indigenous Khanty name of a small river near the city, neft means oil in Russian, and gaz is natural gas. The economy of the city remains petroleum-based, and was a major center for the Russian oil enterprise YUKOS, which owned Yuganskneftegaz. In fact, the "Yu" in "YUKOS" comes from the "yu" in "Nefteyugansk" and therefore from "Yuganskneftegaz". The other three letters come from the oil-refining factory "Kuibyshev-Org-Sintez", situated in Samara.

On June 26, 1998, city mayor Vladimir Petukhov was shot dead on the way to his office. Before his murder, Petukhov had been on a hunger strike demanding that the chairmen of municipal and district tax offices be dismissed from their positions and a criminal case against Yukos be filed on counts of tax evasion. Petukhov's widow later on called for an investigation into Mikhail Khodorkovsky's role in events. Back then Khodorkovsky was head of Yukos. On September 20, 2005 Dmitry Yegortsev, acting mayor of Nefteyugansk, was assaulted and wounded with a knife. After the stabbing of Yegortsev, Igor Gribanov took over City Hall as acting mayor. Just a few months later, he died of carbon monoxide poisoning at his home on January 6, 2006.

Since January 2005, Yuganskneftegaz has been owned by the state-owned oil company Rosneft.

The mayor of Nefteyugansk is Sergey Dektyarev.

Administrative and municipal status
Within the framework of administrative divisions, Nefteyugansk serves as the administrative center of Nefteyugansky District, even though it is not a part of it. As an administrative division, it is incorporated separately as the city of okrug significance of Nefteyugansk—an administrative unit with the status equal to that of the districts. As a municipal division, the city of okrug significance of Nefteyugansk is incorporated as Nefteyugansk Urban Okrug'.

Transportation
The city is served by the Surgut International Airport.

Consumer market
On the territory of the municipality, the population is provided with goods and services: 447 shops, 33 wholesale enterprises, 1 city market for 901 jobs; 141 catering establishments for 8276 seats; 274 facilities for the provision of various types of services.
In 2010, 8 stores were opened with a trading area of 8.7 thousand square meters; 6 catering establishments for 383 seats.

The city has a large number of large specialized shops selling food and non-food products. Among the federal networks represented in the city, one can single out: Pyaterochka, DNS, Domostroy, Red & White, Wildberries.

Climate
Nefteyugansk has a subarctic climate (Dfc) like most of Russia. Summers are mild to warm with cool nights. Winters are long and very cold.

Sport
The most popular sport in Nefteyugansk is skiing, biathlon, futsal and martial arts. The most sportsmen from Yugansk win different All-Russian, European and World competitions.

Sport subjects in town:
Sport home «Sibiryak»
Stadium «Neftyanik»
Ice home
Sport complex «Olimp»
Fitness club «Aelita»
On 16 September 2014 was opened new modern sport complex - Centre Physical Education and Sports «Zhemchuzhina Yugry»

Sport clubs:
Hockey club «Rosneft-Yuganskneftegaz»
Futsal club «BLIK-Nefteyugansk» is playing in Russian Futsal Championship. Home area - «Zhemchuzhina Yugry»

Twin cities
 Anklam, Germany
 Târgovişte, Romania

References

Notes

 Nefteyugansk Mayor Dies in Fire at Home, by Anatoly Medetsky, themoscowtimes.com, Jan. 11, 2006

Sources

External links
Official website of the Nefteyugansk City Administration 
Notes of a local resident. Photos of the city. 
 Informational website of Nefteyugansk

Cities and towns in Khanty-Mansi Autonomous Okrug
Cities and towns built in the Soviet Union
Populated places established in 1967
1967 establishments in the Soviet Union
Populated places on the Ob River